List winners of USSR championship in International draughts.

The annual draughts competition was held in the USSR from 1954 to 1991. The first official championship was held in 1954 in Leningrad. It was preceded by the All-Union Training Tournament in 1953, in which 16 draughtsmtn participated, 12 of them were Master of Sports of the USSR. In some years, an additional match was held to determine the winner. Since 1986, they began to conduct a preliminary stage - 32 participants according to Swiss system in 9 rounds determined the final ten, which played the title of champion. The first league was also created. The last championship was held in 1991 in connection with the disintegration of the USSR. Many Russian draughts players became world champion in International draughts.

References

External links
Results USSR championships in database KNDB
Архив журнала «Шашки» 1959-1992 на сайте Checkers USA 
Архив журнала «Шашки» 1959-1992 
Hall of fame

Draughts competitions